Time Adventure: Zeccho 5-byo Mae is a 1986 Japanese pink film directed by Yōjirō Takita.

Synopsis
A softcore sex film in Nikkatsu's Roman Porno series with comedy and science fiction themes. A sexy young woman travels 15 years into the future to 2001, where she engages in various sexual escapades.

Cast
 Kozue Tanaka
 Yukijirō Hotaru
 Saeko Kizuki
 Yuji Nogami
 Kaori Sugita
 Shinobu Wakana

References

External links
 
 

1986 films
1986 comedy films
1980s science fiction films
Films directed by Yōjirō Takita
Japanese comedy films
Japanese science fiction films
1980s Japanese-language films
Nikkatsu films
Nikkatsu Roman Porno
Japanese pornographic films
1980s Japanese films